Thomas Wode was an English judge.

Thomas Wode may also refer to:
Thomas Wode (MP), English politician
Thomas Wode (MP for Wallingford), see Wallingford (UK Parliament constituency)

See also
Thomas Wood (disambiguation)